Kitson Cécile (born May 4, 1984) is a footballer from Seychelles.

In a 2017 Africa Cup of Nations qualifying match, the goalkeeper made three or more saves to make up for the shambolic defense during the final minutes, tying Ethiopia 1-1.

Honors

 Seychelles Presidents Cup (1): 2015 runners-up

References

External links
 

Living people
1984 births
Seychellois footballers
Seychelles international footballers
Association football goalkeepers
Cote d'Or FC players